Čair Sports Center, commonly known as Čair Hall is an indoor sporting arena located in Niš, Serbia. The seating capacity of the arena is 4,800 for sports events and 6,500 at concerts. It is home to the KK Konstantin basketball team, RK Železničar 1949 handball team and OK Niš volleyball team.

History
The sports center "22 December" was opened in 1973, as largest sports center in the city of Niš. Later, its name was changed to "Čair Sports Center".

It was completely reconstructed in 2011 for the needs of 2012 European Men's Handball Championship, as it was named one of tournament's venues. The reconstruction has been done according to highest European standards and criteria submitted by EHF, making Čair one of the most modern sporting halls in Serbia.

The first match played in the Hall since it was reconstructed was between the senior women's handball national teams of Serbia and Greece, on 19 October 2011 within EHF for Women 2012 Championship Qualifications.

Sporting events
 Radivoj Korać Cup: 2003, 2008–2010, 2012, 2015–2019
 2012 European Men's Handball Championship
 2012 European Women's Handball Championship
 2012 Davis Cup tie between Serbia and Sweden
 2013 World Women's Handball Championship
 2013 Fed Cup match between Serbia and Slovakia
 2014 FIVB Volleyball Men's World Championship qualification
 2017 Davis Cup tie between Serbia and Russia
 2018 Davis Cup tie between Serbia and United States
 EuroBasket Women 2019 Group C

Notable concerts
 2 February 1975 – Predrag Jovičić, vocalist of the rock band San, died from an electric shock onstage.
 8 March 1998 – Rock band Galija held a concert in the Hall. The recording of the concert was released on the live album Ja jesam odavde.
 15 December 2011 – Hard rock band Kerber celebrated their 30th anniversary with a concert in the Hall. The concert featured numerous guests: Dragoljub Đuričić, Kornelije Kovač, Dejan Najdanović, Neverne Bebe, YU Grupa, and others.
 11 February 2023 - Pop star Milica Pavlović held very first solistic concert in front of 6500 people.

See also
 Stadion Čair
 List of indoor arenas in Serbia

References

External links

 

Indoor arenas in Serbia
Basketball venues in Serbia
Buildings and structures in Niš
Sport in Niš
2012 European Women's Handball Championship
Volleyball venues in Serbia
Handball venues in Serbia